is a national park in Kumamoto and Ōita Prefectures, Japan. The park derives its name from Mount Aso, the largest active volcano in Japan, and the Kujū mountains.

History
Established as Aso National Park in 1934, in 1986 after extension the park was renamed Aso Kujū National Park.

Related municipalities
 Kumamoto: Aso, Kikuchi, Minamiaso, Minamioguni, Oguni, Ōzu, Takamori, Ubuyama
 Ōita: Beppu, Kokonoe, Kusu, Taketa, Yufu

See also
List of national parks of Japan

References

External links
  Aso Kujū National Park
  Aso Kujū National Park
 Map of Aso Kujū National Park (North)
 Map of Aso Kujū National Park (South)

National parks of Japan
Parks and gardens in Kumamoto Prefecture
Parks and gardens in Ōita Prefecture
Protected areas established in 1934